This is a list of notable fictional immortals with articles on Wikipedia.

A

Ainur (Middle-earth)
Alexander Corvinus
Richard Alpert (Lost)
Alucard (Hellsing)
Amanda (Highlander)
Angel (Buffy)
Angelique Bouchard Collins
Aphrodite (Xena and Hercules)
Apocalypse (comics)
Aragami (film)
Arawn Death-Lord
Archer & Armstrong
Architect (The Matrix)
Ares (Hercules and Xena)
Armand (The Vampire Chronicles)
Ashildr (Doctor Who)
Atalanta (Pantheon)
Avatars (Charmed)
Ayesha (novel)
Azazel (Supernatural)

B

Barbas (Charmed)
Kurt Barlow
Baš Čelik
Bicentennial Man (film)
Maureen Birnbaum, Barbarian Swordsperson
The Boat of a Million Years
Tom Bombadil (Middle Earth)
Brunnen-G
Bungle (Rainbow)

C

C.C. (Code Geass)
Princess Cadance
Callisto (Xena)
Captain Scarlet (character)
Carl Brutananadilewski
John Carter of Mars
Casca (series)
Castiel (Supernatural)
Princess Celestia
Celestial Toymaker
Chia Black Dragon
Christian Walker (fictional character)
Chucky (Child's Play)
Chử Đồng Tử
Mort Cinder
Coeurl
Barnabas Collins
Quentin Collins
Coop (Charmed)
Michael Corvin
Marcus Corvinus
Edward Cullen
Esme Cullen
Carlisle Cullen
Emmet Cullen

D

Damien Darkblood
Darius (Highlander)
Dawn (comics)
Deadpool (comics)
The Deaths of Ian Stone
Demona
The Doctor
Claudia Donovan (Warehouse 13)

E
Errand of Mercy
Eru Ilúvatar
Eve (Angel)

F

The Fairy with Turquoise Hair
Hugh Fitzcairn (Highlander)
Four Horsemen (Highlander)
Frankenstein's monster
Frylock

G

Hob Gadling
Gamzee Makara (Homestuck)
Gandalf
Garlic Jr.
Ghost Rider
Thánh Gióng
Mister Gone
Godzilla
 Thalia Grace (Percy Jackson)
Dorian Gray

H

Jasper Hale
 Rosalie Hale
Jessica Hamby
Jack Harkness (Doctor Who)
Heggra
Hidan (Naruto)

I

Duncan Idaho (Dune)
Imhotep (character)
Immortal (Highlander)
The Immortal (short story)
Immortal Rain
Isaac and Miria

J

Jareth
Jazinda
Jeepers Creepers (2001 film)
Jesus Christ (Christianity)
John the Apostle (Mormonism)
Davy Jones (Pirates of the Caribbean)

K

Kai (LEXX)
Kaim Argonar
Kane (Command & Conquer)
Kane (fantasy)
Kassandra (Assassin's Creed Odyssey)
Yasunori Katō
Kayako Saeki
Rama Khan
Nick Knight (Forever Knight)
Koschei
Karl Ruprecht Kroenen
Freddy Krueger
Kurgan (Highlander)

L
La Belle Dame sans Merci
Nicolas de Lenfent
Tabitha Lenox
Lestat de Lioncourt
Liễu Hạnh
Lilith (30 Days of Night)
Lazarus Long (Methuselah's Children)
Locke the Superman
Long Live Walter Jameson.
Lord Fear
Lorien (Babylon 5)
Lorne (Angel)
Princess Luna (My Little Pony)

M

Macbeth (Gargoyles)
Connor MacLeod (Highlander)
Duncan MacLeod (Highlander)
Helen Magnus (Sanctuary)
Emilia Marty/Ellian MacGregor/Elina Makropulos (The Makropulos Affair)
Man in Black (Lost)
Rex Matheson (Torchwood)
Mayor (Buffy the Vampire Slayer)
Kenny McCormick
The Medallion
Melkor
Merlin
Mermaid Saga
Ming the Merciless
Miri
Mnemosyne (anime)
The Modern World (novel)
Daniel Molloy
Adam Monroe
Dr. Henry Morgan (Forever)
Mumm-Ra
Mummies Alive!
Michael Myers (Halloween)

N

Three Nephites (Mormonism)
Nero
No Present Like Time
Nome King

O

Oberon
Oberon's children
Ōgon Bat
John Oldman (The Man from Earth)
Eben Olemaun
Stella Olemaun
The Omega Glory
Oracle (The Matrix)

P

Pamela Swynford De Beaufort
Pandora (novel)
Kenneth Parcell
Paris (Pantheon)

Pazuzu (The Exorcist)
Peter Pan
The Picture of Dorian Gray
Pinhead (Hellraiser)
Plato's Stepchildren
Louis de Pointe du Lac
Puck (A Midsummer Night's Dream)
Pug (fictional character)
List of Puppet Master characters

Q

Q (Star Trek)
Q Continuum (Star Trek)
Queen of the Nile (The Twilight Zone)

R

Juan Sánchez Villa-Lobos Ramírez (Highlander)
Ra's al Ghul (Comics)
Rat King
Jesse Reeves
Return to Tomorrow
Perry Rhodan
Michael Roa Valdamjong
Romãozinho
Hugo Rune
Richie Ryan (Highlander)
Ryuk (Death Note)

S

 Takeo Saeki
 Toshio Saeki
 Sailor Moon (character)
Santanico Pandemonium
Vandal Savage
The Seer (Charmed)
Selene (Underworld)
Master Shake
She: A History of Adventure
Shinigami (Death Note)
Signum (Nanoha)
Skeleton Man
Slappy the Dummy
Arvin Sloane (Alias)
Sons of the Dark
Sorceress of Castle Grayskull
The Source (Charmed)
Space Ghost
Space Seed
Starscream
Stingy Jack
Struldbrug
Sun Wukong
Bella Swan

T

 Tản Viên Sơn Thánh
 Tarzan (Tarzan's Quest)
 Thirteen Ghosts
 Torquemada (comics)
 Triad (Charmed)
 Cole Turner
 Will Turner

V

Vandal Savage 
Velasca
Vicente (30 Days of Night)
Vita (Nanoha)
Jason Voorhees

W

Wandering Jew
White Witch
Who Mourns for Adonais?	
Wisdom's Daughter
Wolf in the Fold
Nick Wolfe
Wonder Woman
Wormhole Aliens ( The prophets - Deep Space Nine - Star Trek )
Wowbagger the Infinitely Prolonged
Wraith (Stargate)
Leo Wyatt (Charmed)

Y

Sadako Yamamura
The Year of Our War
Nathan Young

Z
Zamasu (Dragon ball super)
Zorak

See also
Immortality in fiction
List of Highlander characters

External links

 
Immortals
Immortals
Fictional characters with accelerated healing